WC Yugra is a Russian women's water polo club from Khanty-Mansiysk founded in 2008. In 2011 and 2012 it reached the final of the LEN Trophy, lost respectively to Ethnikos Piraeus and RN Imperia.

References

Yugra
Yugra WC
Zaragoza
2008 establishments in Russia